The International Labour Organization Worst Forms of Child Labour Convention (Convention No. 182) calls for time-bound programmes for the eradication of the worst forms of child labour. Countries ratifying this Convention must take immediate and effective measures to secure the prohibition and elimination of the worst forms of child labour (WFCL) as a matter of urgency.

Time-bound measures
Time-bound measures to address this issue will attempt to:
Prevent the engagement of children in the worst forms of child labour. 
Provide direct assistance for the removal of children from the worst forms of child labour and for their rehabilitation and social integration. 
Ensure access to free basic education and appropriate vocational training for all children removed from the worst forms of child labour. 
Identify and reach out to children at special risk, and 
Take account of the special situation of girls.

Time-bound programmes
The Time-Bound Programme (TBP) approach constitutes one of the means put in place by the International Programme on the Elimination of Child Labour (IPEC) to assist countries in fulfilling their obligations under the convention.

TBPs are designed as a comprehensive framework that governments can use to chart a course of action with well-defined targets. They comprise a set of integrated and coordinated policies and interventions with concise goals, specific targets and a defined time frame, aimed at preventing and eliminating a country’s WFCL. They emphasize the need to address the root causes of child labour, linking action for the latter’s elimination to national development policy, macro-economic trends and strategies, and demographic and labour market processes and outcomes, with particular emphasis on economic and social policies to combat poverty and to promote universal basic education and social mobilization. The TBP’s time horizon is set in accordance with the prevalence of the WFCL, the availability of resources, the level of local expertise and other conditions prevailing in the country.

Focusing heavily on the rapid elimination of the worst forms of child labour, the TBP approach represents a logical progression of IPEC’s work to date while drawing on the experience that has been accumulating since the programme’s inception. TBPs pull together many of the successful approaches piloted by IPEC and others in the past into a comprehensive and scaled-up programme combining upstream policy-oriented interventions covering awareness raising, legislation and enforcement, education, employment and social protection with withdrawal and rehabilitation interventions. IPEC sees the TBP as a key strategic approach for attaining large-scale impact on the WFCL.

See also
Southern Africa (Botswana, Lesotho, Namibia, South Africa, Swaziland): Programme Towards the Elimination of the worst forms of Child Labour (TECL)

References
 ILO Convention No. 182, Articles 1 and 7.
 http://www.ilo.org/public/english/standards/ipec/themes/timebound/tbp.htm

External links
IPEC’s TBP Home Page
TBP Manual for Action Planning
TBPs, Botswana, Lesotho, Namibia, South Africa and Swaziland
TBP, El Salvador
TBP, Nepal
TBP, Tanzania

International Labour Organization
Child labour